The Minas Gerais tyrannulet (Phylloscartes roquettei) is a species of bird in the family Tyrannidae. It is endemic to Brazil. Its natural habitat is subtropical or tropical dry forests. It is threatened by habitat loss.

References

External links
BirdLife Species Factsheet.

Minas Gerais tyrannulet
Birds of the Cerrado
Endemic birds of Brazil
Minas Gerais tyrannulet
Minas Gerais tyrannulet
Taxonomy articles created by Polbot